Ivan Kulesh (1986 – November 2016) was a Belarusian criminal and serial killer. Between 2013 and 2014, the drunken Kulesh killed three saleswomen in two stores in the Lida District, Grodno Region, after which he stole money and goods. For his crimes, he was sentenced to death and subsequently executed.

Biography 
An orphan since 6 months old (his mother died shortly after birth, and never knew his father), Kulesh was brought up in an orphanage with his brother and sister. He graduated from the 9th grade school, and at age 18, was convicted of theft. After his release, Ivan was engaged in temporary part-time work for his neighbors, worked for a while at an autoservice station and at a construction site, as well as picking berries and mushrooms. Officially, he was registered in the Baranovichy District, but lived in the Lida District.

Kulesh's common-law wife described him as a man who often drank, but was rarely prone to outbursts of aggression. He had explained to her his unwillingness to change his life by saying that "everyone around was also drinking." "I always wondered how could he be so calm. I could scream and shout: how much can you drink, and in response - nothing", she told reporters. According to her, Ivan spent his free time drinking beer, smoking cigarettes, playing computer games and sleeping, paying very little attention to her and their child.

On the evening of September 15, 2013, two saleswomen (born in 1968 and 1957, respectively) were killed in a store on the outskirts of Lida. Around 35 to 37 million rubles were stolen from the store, as well as alcoholic beverages. After these murders, the Lida Police Department sent out orientations to two local residents born in 1978 and 1979. Subsequently, Kulesh confessed to this double murder: according to him, he had come to Lida for City Day, got drunk, and when he ran out of money, he decided to steal something and stumbled upon the store. Finding a metal pipe nearby, he entered the now-closed store through the back door and hit the first saleswoman on the head, and the second one in the sales area. Then, he returned several times and struck new blows on the victims. The stolen amount was spent in about six months: he supplied his common-law wife with money (two months after the crime, she gave birth to a daughter), but the woman denied having received more money than before. When the money ran out, he laid a laptop in a pawn shop and wrote a statement about the theft (allegedly, the laptop was stolen on a train). For the false report, he was given a fine worth 4,5 million rubles. It was reported that he had been interviewed once for the case, but was too drunk to say anything.

On November 28, 2014, near the village of Selets, Kulesh, while intoxicated, struck a 44-year-old saleswoman of a local store several times with an axe, taking the keys and, according to various sources, stealing between 5 and 8 million rubles, as well as alcoholic drinks, cigarettes, sausages and sweets worth another 8 million rubles. While leaving the store, he ran into the victim's son, who had already found the body of his mother in the woods thanks to a barking dog. Threatening him with a knife, Kulesh ran away and took a train to Baranavichy. The son of the murdered woman reported the criminal to the police, and Kulesh was detained on the train at Novoelnya Station.

After the arrest, Kulesh began to cooperate and confessed to the double murder in the hope of replacing the death penalty with a life sentence: "I understood that I could not get away. They said that for the jury, a confession could be a mitigating circumstance. <...> Maybe in 50 years, I will see my daughter," he said at the trial. A judicial examination found that Kulesh suffered from an antisocial personality disorder, but was otherwise sane.

Kulesh was tried under several articles of the Criminal Code of Belarus - for Attempted Crime, Murder, Theft and Robbery. In the pre-trial detention center, Kulesh visited a priest and a psychologist, and began taking antidepressants. In letters directed to Ivan, from his brother outside the center, much had been crossed out by the prison censor. The case was handled by the Grodno Regional Court, and on November 20, 2015, the court sentenced Ivan Kulesh to death.

Kulesh's defense filed a cassation appeal to the Supreme Court of Belarus. Relatives of the convict, who had previously barely participated in the trial, questioned Kulesh's participation in the first two murders. The lawyer focused the attention of the Supreme Court on the fact that the double murder in Lida was disclosed solely on the testimony of the defendant, since the police did not have fingerprints or the murder weapon. Another peculiarity was noted in the case: during the investigative experiment, Kulesh in detail presented the way to the southern region of Lida, where, according to him, he was on the day of the double murder for the first time after drinking 2 bottles of vodka and about 1 liter of beer, but did not remember whether the victims resisted. The fate of the 35-37 million rubles was also unclear - the common-law wife stated that after the double murder, Kulesh did not bring any more money home. Kulesh himself, however, agreed with the verdict, and on March 29, 2016, the Supreme Court upheld it.

On 5 November 2016, Ivan Kulesh was executed, along with two other convicts.

See also 
 List of serial killers by country

References 

1986 births
2013 murders in Belarus
2014 murders in Belarus
2016 deaths
2010s murders in Belarus
Belarusian people convicted of murder
Executed Belarusian serial killers
Male serial killers
People convicted of murder by Belarus
People with antisocial personality disorder
People executed by Belarus
People executed for murder
Prisoners and detainees of Belarus
Violence against women in Belarus